The Hungarian women's national ice hockey team represents Hungary at the International Ice Hockey Federation (IIHF) Women's World Championship and other senior international women's tournaments. The women's national team is organized by the Magyar Jégkorong Szövetség (Hungarian Ice Hockey Federation). The Hungarian women's national team was ranked 12th in the world in 2020. They hosted and won the 2019 World Championship Division I Group A tournament in Budapest. The victory earned promotion to the Top Division for the first time in team history.

Ice hockey increased in popularity among women in Hungary during the later part of the 2010s. Hungary had 477 female players registered with the IIHF in 2016 and, by 2020, the number had more than doubled to 1,144.

Tournament record

Olympic
The Hungarian women's hockey team has never qualified for an Olympic tournament.

World Championships
2000 – Finished in 22nd place
2001 – Finished in 24th place
2003 – Finished in 24th place (4th in Division III)
2004 – Finished in 24th place (3rd in Division III)
2005 – Finished in 24th place (4th in Division III)
2007 – Finished in 25th place (4th in Division III)
2008 – Finished in 26th place (5th in Division III)
2009 – Division III canceled
2011 – Finished in 22nd place (3rd in Division III)
2012 – Finished in 22nd place (2nd in Division IIA)
2013 – Finished in 21st place (1st in Division IIA, Promoted to Division IB)
2014 – Finished in 17th place (3rd in Division IB)
2015 – Finished in 18th place (4th in Division IB)
2016 – Finished in 15th place (1st in Division IB, Promoted to Division IA)
2017 – Finished in 13th place (5th in Division IA)
2018 – Finished in 12th place (3rd in Division IA)
2019 – Finished in 11th place (1st in Division IA, Promoted to Top Division)
2020 – Cancelled due to the COVID-19 pandemic
2021 – Finished in 9th place
2022 – Finished in 8th place

Team

Current roster
Roster for the 2022 IIHF Women's World Championship.

Head coach: Pat Cortina

Head coaches
 Tibor Balogh (1997–1999)
 Bence Vadócz (1999–2001)
 Vladimir Matejov (2001–2002)
 Tibor Balogh (2002–2005)
 László Pindák (2006–2007)
 András Kis (2007–2009)
 Csaba Gömöri (2011–2014)
 Dwayne Gylywoychuk (2015)
 Tibor Marton (2015–2018)
 Jari Risku (2018–2019)
 Pat Cortina (2019–2020)
 Lisa Haley (2020–)

Awards and honors
Fanni Gasparics, Directorate Award, Best Forward, 2019 IIHF Women's World Championship Division I

References

External links

IIHF profile

 
Women's national ice hockey teams in Europe
Ice hockey teams in Hungary